Highland Heights may refer to several places in the United States of America:

 Highland Heights, Kentucky
 Highland Heights, Ohio
 Highland Heights, Memphis, Tennessee
 Highland Heights, Virginia